43 Squadron or 43rd Squadron may refer to:

 No. 43 Squadron RAAF, a unit of the Royal Australian Air Force
 No. 43 Squadron RAF, a unit of the United Kingdom Royal Air Force
 43d Fighter Squadron, a unit of the United States Air Force
 43d Flying Training Squadron, a unit of the United States Air Force
 43d Aeromedical Evacuation Squadron, a unit of the United States Air Force

See also
 43rd Division (disambiguation)
 43rd Group (disambiguation)
 43rd Brigade (disambiguation)
 43rd Regiment (disambiguation)
 43rd Battalion (disambiguation)